Jet Set Records is a French record label owned by Enzo Hamilton, which specialized in Jamaican music reissues. It was most active in the 1990s.

Apart from artists' compilations they also focused on record producer works with albums on Leslie Kong, Phil Pratt and Derrick Harriott. Jet Set is particularly noted for its series of CD reissues of original ska and rocksteady LPs from Duke Reid's Treasure Isle label. These were co-ordinated by label manager Patrick Ungur in Paris, and featured the original Jamaican sleeve artwork and graphics 
by label's art director Yves Loffredo, with new liner notes by English music journalist Mike Atherton.

Enzo Hamilton had previously worked with UK r&b and soul reissue label Charly Records, and had his own Culture Press label, based in Marlow, Buckinghamshire, before moving to Paris and establishing Lagoon Records, the predecessor of Jet Set.

Discography
Desmond Dekker - Action (1967-1968)
Various Artists - Best Of Sun Shot Volume 1 (1971-1975)
Various Artists - Come Rock With Me In Jamaica: Rock Steady Soul (1968)
Various Artists - Easy Rocksteady Of 1969: Jamaican Hits Go Stereo
The Gaylads - Fire & Rain (1970-1971) - 1999
Ken Boothe - Freedom Street (1970)
Various Artists - Gay Jamaica Independence Time (1970)
Various Artists - Greater Jamaica: Moon Walk Reggay (1966-1970)
Don Drummond - Greatest Hits: Greatest Trombone Player 	
Various Artists - Greatest Jamaican Beat: Rock Steady Baba Boom Time 	
Various Artists - Heavy Reggae 1971-1972: Best Of Sioux Label 	
Desmond Dekker - Intensified (1967-1968)
Don Drummond - Jazz Ska Attack (1964)
Various Artists - Latin Goes Ska (1963-1964)
Various Artists - Leslie Kong's Connection Volume 1 (1969-1971)
Various Artists - Leslie Kong's Connection Volume 2 (1969-1971)
King Sighta - Master Of All (1976) - 1999
The Paragons - On The Beach 	
Various Artists - Raw Roots Volume 1 (1970-1975) - 1998
Various Artists - Raw Roots Volume 2 (1971-1978)
Rico - Rico's Message: Jamaican Jazz
Various Artists - Rock Steady Beat: Treasure Isle's Greatest Hits (1966-1968)
Various Artists - Soul For Sale: Regay Rock Steady Music (1968-1969)
Toots & the Maytals - Sweet & Dandy
The Skatalites - The Skatalite (1964-1966)
U Roy - Version Galore (1970)

See also
 List of record labels

French record labels
Reggae record labels
Reissue record labels